Mark Twain State Park and Soaring Eagles Golf Course is a  state park located in the Town of Horseheads in Chemung County, New York. The park was named for Mark Twain, who spent several summers in the area.

Facilities
The park includes the 18-hole Soaring Eagles Golf Course, which is designed around several kettle ponds created by retreating glaciers following the most recent ice age. The park also includes a food concession, and facilitates cross-country skiing and archery hunting in season.

See also
 List of New York state parks

References

External links
 New York State Parks: Mark Twain State Park
 New York State Parks: Soaring Eagles Golf Course

Golf clubs and courses in New York (state)
State parks of New York (state)
Parks in Chemung County, New York